Superman and Other Galactic Heroes is the fourth album from a series of film-inspired disco records, by composer and producer Meco Monardo and was released in 1978. It was the first Meco record to be released on Casablanca Records, and again features orchestral arrangements by Harold Wheeler. As with his previous records, Meco sticks pretty closely to the formula he established with the popular Star Wars and Other Galactic Funk.

Side One consists of a 16-minute disco arrangement of the themes from the film Superman: The Movie (1978), while Side Two contains four original compositions by Harold Wheeler. A single edit from the first side was released ("Can You Read My Mind"), but wasn't a hit.

Track listing 
Themes From Superman
 Main Title Theme	
 The Destruction Of Krypton	
 The Trip To Earth	
 Growing Up	
 Fortress Of Solitude	
 March Of The Villains	
 The Flying Sequence	
 Can You Read My Mind?	
 Chasing Rockets	
 Turning Back The World	
 End Title Theme	
 Reprise: Love Theme From Superman
	
Other Galactic Heroes
 The Boy Wonder
 The Caped Crusader 
 Lord Of The Jungle
 The Amazing Amazon

1978 albums
Superman music
Casablanca Records albums
Meco albums